Antonio Fischer (born 9 August 1996) is a German professional footballer who plays as a defender for FC Black Stars Basel.

References

External links
 
 

1996 births
Living people
Footballers from Baden-Württemberg
German footballers
Association football defenders
3. Liga players
Swiss Promotion League players
FSV Frankfurt players
KF Flamurtari players
BSC Old Boys players
FC Black Stars Basel players
German expatriate footballers
German expatriate sportspeople in Kosovo
Expatriate footballers in Kosovo
German expatriate sportspeople in Switzerland
Expatriate footballers in Switzerland